Walter Faria (born 1955) is a Brazilian businessman, the owner of Grupo Petrópolis, the brewer of Brazil's second-largest selling beer.

Early life
Walter Faria was born in 1955.

Career
In 1998, Faria bought Grupo Petrópolis, which is the only large brewery that is 100% Brazilian owned.

Personal life
He is married with one child.

References

1955 births
Living people
Brazilian businesspeople
Brazilian billionaires